André Djaoui (born in Tunis) is a producer, painter, writer and film director.

Filmography 
 1981: L'Amant de Lady Chatterley de Just Jaeckin
 1983: Au nom de tous les miens de Robert Enrico
 1985: Liberté, égalité, choucroute de Jean Yanne
 1986: La famille d'Ettore Scola
 1986: Pourvu que ce soit une fille de Mario Monicelli
 1987: Trois sœurs de Margarethe von Trotta
 1988: Une nuit à l'Assemblée Nationale de Jean-Pierre Mocky
 1990: Les 1001 nuits de Philippe de Broca
 1990: La voce della luna de Federico Fellini
 2005: Ô Jérusalem de Élie Chouraqui

Audiovisual works 

In 1992, André Djaoui co-produced with Antenne 2, Rai 2, RTVE, NHK Japan, Channel 4 UK, USA Warner video, a series of seven Portraits of Scientists, writers, artists, politicians, Philosophers who changed the world. These films were made for television by leading filmmakers: Kafka by Zbigniew Rybczynski, Darwin by Peter Greenaway, Vivaldi by Lina Wertmüller, Ben Gurion by Jerry Schatzberg, Einstein by Michael Ritchie, Chekhov by Nikita Mikhalkov and Gershwin by Alain Resnais.

Musical comedy 

In 1994, André Djaoui produced King David, a Broadway musical (lyrics by Tim Rice and music by Alan Menken).
This is a work inspired by the Bible, especially the books of Samuel, the Book of Chronicles and the Book of Psalms. King David was designed as part of the celebration of the 3000 years of the foundation of Jerusalem.

Theater 

André Djaoui is also writing for the theater. After meeting with Philippe Grimbert, they write a play named Back.

Painting 

In 2008, he decided to start a new life in Israel as an artist. His paintings were exhibited in Tel-Aviv in 2009. His artworks are also present in Miami since 2015.

References

Living people
People from Tunis
Tunisian film directors
Tunisian male writers
Tunisian painters
Tunisian film producers
Year of birth missing (living people)